Gwendolyn Lau (born March 23, 1975) is an American voice actress who works for anime series at Funimation/OkraTron 5000. She has provided voices for a number of English-language versions of Japanese anime series.

She had taken a hiatus from voice acting which led to some of her former roles being recast with new voice actresses. She has since come back to voice acting.

Filmography

Anime
 Aquarion – Manamana (Ep. 4)
 Baldr Force EXE Resolution – Minori Segawa
 BECK: Mongolian Chop Squad – Momoko Ogasawara
 Black Cat – Silphy Deacroft
 Burst Angel – Lava
 Case Closed (FUNimation dub) – Kirsten Thomas, Yuko Ikezawa, Marion Karmichael, Ari Hannigan, Alice Nagel, Harmony Wilson, Patti Parsley, Meg Wexham
 Desert Punk – Noriko (Ep. 2)
 Drifters – Olminu
 El Cazador de la Bruja – Margarita (Ep. 10)
 Fairy Tail – Daphne
 Fullmetal Alchemist and Fullmetal Alchemist: Brotherhood – Sheska
 The Galaxy Railways – Jane (Ep. 4), Catalina (Ep. 11-12)
 Ghost Hunt – Kei Ubusuna (Ep. 7-10)
 Glass Fleet – Gouda
 Gunslinger Girl -Il Teatrino – Rachelle (Ep. 10)
 Harmony – Marimi Sakurai
 Hell Girl – Keiko Yasuda (Ep. 6)
 Jormungand series – Dr. Minami "Miami" Amada
 Kiddy Grade – Mercredi, Vendredi
 Last Exile: Fam, the Silver Wing – Vasant
 Mushishi – Sayo (Ep. 16)
 Negima! series – Misa Kakizaki, Nekane Springfield
 One Piece – Makino (Funimation dub)
 Rumbling Hearts – Azusa Ishida
 Samurai 7 – Yukino
 School Rumble series – Sarah Adiemus
 Shin-Chan – Patty Milfer (Seasons 1-2)
 SoltyRei – Illumina Kisch
 Spiral: The Bonds of Reasoning – Madoka Narumi
 Suzuka – Ayano Fujikawa
 Trinity Blood – Kate Scott
 Tsubasa: Reservoir Chronicle – Chenyan
 Tsukuyomi: Moon Phase – Haiji (Cat)
 Witchblade – Rie Nishida
 xxxHolic – Nanami (Ep. 8)
 Yu Yu Hakusho – Kuroko Satou

References

External links
 

American voice actresses
1975 births
Living people
21st-century American women